Charcot-Marie-Tooth neuropathy, X-linked 3 (dominant) is a protein that in humans is encoded by the CMTX3 gene.

References

Further reading 

 
 
 

Genes on human chromosome X
Human proteins